Charlotte von Majláth (1856–1928), was an Austrian court official.   

She was the lady-in-waiting to Empress Elisabeth of Austria. She was a favorite and confidant of the empress.

References 

1856 births
1928 deaths
Austrian ladies-in-waiting